The grey-bellied sunskink (Lampropholis robertsi) is a species of skink, a lizard in the family Scincidae. The species is endemic to Queensland in Australia.

References

Skinks of Australia
Endemic fauna of Australia
Reptiles described in 1991
Lampropholis
Taxa named by Glen Joseph Ingram